Fiore de Henriquez (1921-2004) was an Italian-British sculptor.

Personal life and education
De Henriquez was born in Trieste to a father descended from Spanish noblemen of the Habsburg court in Vienna; her mother was of Turkish and Russian origin. She had one older brother, Diego, who went on to found the War Museum in Trieste. De Henriquez studied at the Accademia di Belle Arti di Venezia under Arturo Martini.

As a teenager, she was a member of the Fascist Youth Movement, but during the Second World War, she worked with the partisan movement and helped escort Jewish refugees to safety. This was due in part to her father's denunciation in 1935 as an anti-Fascist, for refusing to Italianise his surname.

In 1949, she left Italy for England, and became a British citizen in 1953; she would live there for much of the rest of her life. However, she also returned often to her native Italy. In 1966, she purchased the ruinous hamlet of Peralta in Tuscany, and spent much time on its restoration as an artists' colony.

De Henriquez was born intersex with ambiguous genitalia, and declared herself "proud to be hermaphrodite" and "two people inside one body". She had a brief relationship with German painter Kurt Kramer in the 1940s, but her primary romantic and sexual relationships were with women. De Henriquez affected an offbeat style of dress; in his diaries, Christopher Isherwood described her as appearing "dressed like a male peasant in Cavalleria Rusticana and announc[ing] that she had a love for life."

Career
She held her exhibition debut in Florence in 1947. Following her move to Britain, she exhibited at the Royal Academy in 1950. In 1951, she produced work to commemorate the Festival of Britain, for which she earned the then enormous fee of £4,000. From the late 1950s until 1975, she spent a few months each year touring North America, working and lecturing.  She had two further solo shows in Rome in 1975 and 1983.

De Henriquez created portrait sculptures of a wide range of individuals, including Igor Stravinsky, Margot Fonteyn, Augustus John, Peter Ustinov, John F. Kennedy, Vivien Leigh, the Queen Mother, Oprah Winfrey and Laurence Olivier. Towards the end of the 1970s, she began to travel in East Asia, and carried out commissions for clients in Japan and Hong Kong. She was a prolific artist, and known to have created some 4000 portraits between 1948 and her death in 2004. She also worked in other areas of sculpture, such as the monumental fountain of dolphins which was erected in a courtyard at the World Intellectual Property Organization headquarters in Geneva.

De Henriquez's gender identity informed much of her work, with its recurring motifs of paired heads, conjoined figures, and ambiguous mythological creatures. Much of her early work was in the primitive mode. From the early 1960s, her friendship with cubist sculptor Jacques Lipchitz encouraged her to experiment with looser forms.

References

Further reading
Jan Marsh, Art & Androgyny: The Life of Sculptor Fiore De Henriquez (2005)

1921 births
2004 deaths
20th-century Italian sculptors
British people of Russian descent
British people of Spanish descent
British people of Turkish descent
Italian people of Russian descent
Italian people of Spanish descent
Italian people of Turkish descent
Italian male sculptors
Artists from Trieste
Accademia di Belle Arti di Venezia alumni
Intersex women
Italian emigrants to the United Kingdom
20th-century Italian male artists